The Uncle from Sumatra (German: Der Onkel aus Sumatra) is a 1930 Austrian silent comedy film directed by Gyula Szöreghy and starring Wolf Albach-Retty, Mary Kid and Rina Marsa.

Cast
 Gyula Szöreghy
 Wolf Albach-Retty
 Hans Unterkircher
 Eugen Guenther
 Rina Marsa
 Mary Kid
 Mizzi Griebl

References

Bibliography
 Weniger, Kay. 'Es wird im Leben dir mehr genommen als gegeben ...' Lexikon der aus Deutschland und Österreich emigrierten Filmschaffenden 1933 bis 1945. ACABUS Verlag, 2011.

External links

1930 films
Austrian silent feature films
Films directed by Gyula Szöreghy
Austrian black-and-white films
Austrian comedy films
1930 comedy films
Silent comedy films
1930s German-language films